Casper the Friendly Ghost is the protagonist of the Famous Studios theatrical animated cartoon series of the same name. He is a pleasant, personable and translucent ghost, but often criticized by his three wicked uncles, the Ghostly Trio. 

The character was featured in 55 theatrical cartoons titled The Friendly Ghost from 1945 to 1959. The character has been featured in comic books published by Harvey Comics since 1952, and Harvey purchased the character outright in 1959. Casper became one of Harvey's most popular characters, headlining dozens of comic book titles.

Following Harvey's purchase of the character, he appeared in five television series: Matty's Funday Funnies (1959–1961), The New Casper Cartoon Show (1963–1970), Casper and the Angels (1979–1980), The Spooktacular New Adventures of Casper (1996–1998) and Casper's Scare School (2009–2012). The character made a theatrical-film appearance in a live-action adaptation released by Universal Pictures, Casper (1995), becoming the first ever computer-generated character to star in a film, and he would later appear in four direct-to-video and made-for-TV follow-up films.

Creation of Casper the Friendly Ghost 
Casper was created by Seymour Reit and Joe Oriolo, the former devising the idea for the character and the latter providing illustrations. Initially intended as the basis for a  children's storybook, there was at first little interest in their idea. When Reit was away on military service during World War II before the book was released, Oriolo sold the rights to the book to Paramount Pictures' Famous Studios animation division for a total of $175. This one-time payment was all that he received, missing out on a share of the revenue earned from the films, comic books and merchandise to come.

The Friendly Ghost, the first Noveltoon to feature Casper, was released by Paramount in 1945 with a few differences from the book. In the cartoon adaptation, Casper is a cute ghost-child with a New York accent who inhabits a haunted house along with a community of adult ghosts who delight in scaring the living. Casper, however, is a nonconformist among ghosts: He would prefer to make friends with people. He packs up his belongings and goes out into the world, hoping to find friends. However, the animals that he meets (a rooster, a mole, a cat, a mouse named Herman, and a group of hens) take one horrified look at him, scream: "A ghost!" and run off in the other direction. Distraught, Casper unsuccessfully attempts to commit suicide (apparently forgetting that he is already dead) by lying down on a railway track before an oncoming train, before he meets two children named Bonnie and Johnny who become his friends. The children's mother, apparently widowed and impoverished, at first is frightened of Casper, but later welcomes him into the family after he unintentionally frightens off a greedy landlord, who, unwilling to own a "haunted" house, tears up the mortgage and gives her the house outright. The short ends with the mother kissing Bonnie, Johnny, and Casper as she sends them off to school, with Casper wearing clothing as if he were a living child.

Casper appeared in two more subsequent cartoons, There's Good Boos To-Night and A Haunting We Will Go. There's Good Boos To-Night differs wildly from later Casper cartoons: although the theme of Casper trying to find a friend and failing in these attempts before succeeding also occurs in later cartoons, the tone of this short turns remarkably dark when a hunter and his dogs appear, chasing the little fox cub named Ferdie that Casper has befriended. Although Casper scares the hunter and dogs away, Casper discovers Ferdie dead after a harrowing chase scene. Happily, however, Ferdie returns as a ghost to join his friend Casper in the afterlife.

These were later adapted into Noveltoons before Paramount started a Casper the Friendly Ghost series in 1950, and ran the theatrical releases until summer 1959. Although having much success, the series was later criticized by animation historians and viewers, mainly due to the story of each entry of the series as being largely the same: Casper (now slightly thinner than the pudgy figure that appeared in the earlier cartoons) escapes from the afterlife of a regular ghost because he finds that scaring people can be tiresome year after year, tries to find friends but inadvertently scares almost everyone, and finally finds a (cute little) friend, whom he saves from some sort of fate, leading to his acceptance by those initially scared of him. In 1955, composer Winston Sharples composed an instrumental theme for Casper's cartoons.

Harvey Comics 

Casper was first published in comics form in August 1949 by St. John Publications, running for five issues until September 1951. In 1952, Alfred Harvey, founder and publisher of Harvey Comics began producing Casper comic books. Casper first appeared in Harvey Comics Hits #61 (Oct 1952), and then moved to a solo book with Casper the Friendly Ghost #7 (December 1952). In 1959, Harvey purchased the rights to the character outright.

Casper went on to headline a large number of comic book series, as well as appearing in back up stories and guest appearances in other titles. The Casper series inspired three popular spinoffs: Spooky the Tuff Little Ghost, Wendy the Good Little Witch, and The Ghostly Trio. Casper's titles include:

 Casper
 Casper Adventure Digest
 Casper and...
 Casper and Friends
 Casper and Friends Magazine
 Casper and Nightmare
 Casper and Spooky
 Casper and The Ghostly Trio
 Casper: A Spirited Beginning (film adaptation)
 Casper Big Book
 Casper Digest
 Casper Digest Stories
 Casper Digest Winners
 Casper Enchanted Tales Digest
 Casper Ghostland
 Casper Giant Size
 Casper Halloween Trick or Treat
 Casper in Space
 Casper in 3-D
 Casper Magazine
 Casper Movie Adaptation
 Casper Space Ship
 Casper's Ghostland
 Casper's Scare School
 Casper's Haunted Christmas
 Casper Special
 Casper Strange Ghost Stories
 Casper, the Friendly Ghost
 Casper TV Showtime
 Famous TV Funday Funnies
 The Friendly Ghost, Casper
 Harvey Two-Pack
 Nightmare and Casper
 Richie Rich and Casper
 Richie Rich, Casper, and Wendy
 TV Casper and Company
 Casper and the Spectrals

In 2009, a new Casper comic was published, called Casper and the Spectrals by Arden Entertainment. Much like The Man of Steel and Batman: Year One did with their respective characters, it revamped Casper and several other Harvey characters for a new audience. After selling 6,400 copies of the first comic, the last two issues were published in 2010.

Television 
Casper has starred in five television shows:

 Matty's Funday Funnies (1959–1961)
 The New Casper Cartoon Show (1963–1970)
 Casper and the Angels (1979–1980)
 The Harveytoons Show known in the UK as  Casper and Friends (1990 –1994)
 The Spooktacular New Adventures of Casper (1996–1998)
 Casper's Scare School (2009–2012)

After Harvey bought the rights to Casper and many other Famous properties in 1959 (including Herman and Katnip, Little Audrey, and Baby Huey), they began broadcasting the post-September 1950 theatrical Famous shorts on a television show sponsored by Mattel Toys titled Matty's Funday Funnies on ABC in 1959 which introduced the Barbie doll to the public. The other Famous produced Casper cartoons had already been acquired by television distributor U.M. & M. TV Corporation in 1956. U.M. & M. retitled just "A Haunting We Will Go", but credited "Featuring Casper The Friendly Ghost" as "Featuring Casper's Friendly Ghost".

New cartoons were created for The New Casper Cartoon Show in 1963, also on ABC. The original Casper cartoons were syndicated under the title Harveytoons (initially repackaged as Casper and Company) in 1963 and ran continuously until the mid-90s. Casper has remained popular in reruns and merchandising.

Hanna-Barbera Productions also gave Casper two holiday specials, Casper's First Christmas (which also starred Yogi Bear, Huckleberry Hound, Snagglepuss, Quick Draw McGraw, Augie Doggie and Doggie Daddy) and Casper's Halloween Special (aka Casper Saves Halloween), and also the Saturday morning cartoon series Casper and the Angels (an animated takeoff on two live-action hit shows Charlie's Angels and CHiPS) in the autumn of 1979, all on NBC. Also featured on the NBC version was a big ghost named Hairy Scary (voiced by John Stephenson). None of Casper's original co-stars appeared in the show.

Between 1990 to 1994, Casper appeared in The Harveytoons Show which was known as Casper and Friends in the UK. This show featured other Harvey Comics characters and series including: Little Audrey, Tommy Tortoise and Moe Hare, Baby Huey, Herman and Katnip, Buzzy the Crow, Modern Madcaps, Possum Pearl, Professor Schmatlz, Jeeper and Creeper and others. The show consisted of Famous Studios-produced cartoons from 1950 to 1964 and each episode of the series included three full cartoons and one "ToonTake" segment.

In 1996, Amblin Entertainment and Universal Cartoon Studios created a new Casper series for Fox Kids called The Spooktacular New Adventures of Casper, based on the 1995 feature, that lasted two years and was never seen on television again after 1998. Two live-action direct-to-video follow-ups to the film, Casper: A Spirited Beginning and Casper Meets Wendy (which introduced Hilary Duff as fellow Harvey Comics character Wendy the Good Little Witch), were made. They were followed by Casper's Haunted Christmas (starring Spooky and Poil from the comics and animated spin-off of the first movie), and Casper's Scare School, which were done entirely in CGI with no live-action elements. These films are often referred to as being "prequels" to the 1995 feature despite the fact that they heartily contradict the feature and do not appear to even take place in the same universe.

In 2007, MoonScoop Group, in association with Classic Media, TF1 and DQ, produced a TV show of 52×12 named Casper's Scare School.

In 2020, Casper appeared in a supporting role in the "Scare Bud" episode of Harvey Girls Forever!, a series based on Harvey Comics characters.

A new live-action television series is in the works at Peacock. The project will be co-produced between Universal Content Productions and DreamWorks Animation with Wu Kai-yu writing and executive producing.

Films 

The Famous Studios version of Casper was scheduled to appear as a cameo in the deleted scene "Acme's Funeral" from the 1988 film Who Framed Roger Rabbit.

Numerous Casper cartoons were released on home video by Universal Studios (via MCA Inc.), which also adopted the friendly ghost into a live-action feature film titled Casper in 1995, where he and his wicked uncles, the Ghostly Trio, were rendered via computer animation, which initially created the first CGI lead character in a film. The film constructed a back-story for the character and is the only time in the series that the question of his death has been addressed. According to the film, Casper was a twelve-year-old boy living in Whipstaff Manor with his inventor father J.T. McFadden until he died from pneumonia after playing out in the cold until it was past nightfall.

In 2001, Harvey Entertainment was acquired by Classic Media which, until 2012, licensed the Harvey properties including Casper.

Casper made a cameo in a MetLife commercial along with several other cartoon characters in 2012. Later that same year, Classic Media was acquired by DreamWorks Animation, which in turn would be acquired by NBCUniversal in 2016, and thus Universal Studios, the producer of the original live-action feature film, now manages the rights to the character and other related characters in addition to regaining the rights to Casper's Haunted Christmas (which Universal itself originally released in late 2000). The rights to Casper Meets Wendy however are owned by Disney through 20th Century Studios Home Entertainment.

In 2019, Casper made an appearance in a GEICO commercial.

Actors who have voiced or portrayed Casper 
 An unknown child actor voiced Casper in The Friendly Ghost in 1945, There's Good Boos To-Night in 1948 and A Haunting We Will Go in 1949.
 Alan Shay and radio actress Cecil Roy voiced Casper in the majority of the Famous Studios cartoons.
 June Foray provided the voice for Mattel's Talking Casper the Friendly Ghost Doll in 1961.
 Mae Questel provided the voice in Golden Records' Casper the Friendly Ghost and Little Audrey Says in 1962.
 Norma MacMillan and Ginny Tyler provided the voice in The New Casper Cartoon Show.
 Julie McWhirter provided the voice in Casper and the Angels.
 Joanna Ruiz provided the voice for a British dub in 1991.
 Christopher Miron Allport voiced Casper in an early 1990s Target commercial.
 Malachi Pearson voiced the character in the 1995 movie Casper and The Spooktacular New Adventures of Casper (1996–1998).
 Devon Sawa is the only actor to ever have played the character in live-action, portraying him in a sequence from the 1995 film in which Casper was temporarily brought back to life.
 April Winchell voiced Casper as a baby in The Spooktacular New Adventures of Casper episode "Three Ghosts and a Baby".
 Lani Minella voiced Casper in Casper: The Interactive Adventure.
 Jeremy Foley voiced the character in Casper: A Spirited Beginning and Casper Meets Wendy.
 Brendon Ryan Barrett provided the voice in Casper's Haunted Christmas.
 Devon Werkheiser voiced Casper in Casper's Scare School.
 Carolyn Hennesy voiced Casper in Casper: Friends Around the World.
 Oliver Stern voiced Casper in a GEICO commercial in 2019.
 Bobby Moynihan voiced Casper in the fourth season of Harvey Girls Forever!

Friends/Supporting characters 

Johnny and Bonnie (The Friendly Ghost)
 Ferdie Fox (There's Good Boo's Tonight)
Dudley Duck (A Haunting We Will Go)
 Wendy the Good Little Witch
 Ghostly Trio (Casper's uncles): Stretch, Fatso and Stinkie 
 The Witch Sisters (Wendy's aunties): Thelma, Velma and Zelma (sometimes)
 Archibald the Talking Wishing Well
 Hot Stuff the Little Devil
 Nightmare the Ghost Horse
 Spooky the Tuff Little Ghost
 Poil The Ghost, Spooky's Girlfriend
 Gned Gnome
 Gnewton Gnome
 Gnorman Gnome
 Sohini
 Arruda
 Richie Rich (occasionally)
 Little Audrey
 Little Dot (Harvey Girls Forever!)
 Little Lotta (Harvey Girls Forever!)
 Hairy Scary (Casper and the Angels, Casper's Halloween Special and Casper's First Christmas)
 Mini and Maxi (Casper and the Angels)
 Nerdly and Fungo (Casper and the Angels)
 The Commander (Casper and the Angels)
 Yogi Bear (Casper's First Christmas)
 Boo-Boo Bear (Casper's First Christmas)
 Santa Claus (Casper's First Christmas)
 Huckleberry Hound (Casper's First Christmas)
 Snagglepuss (Casper's First Christmas)
 Quick-Draw McGraw (Casper's First Christmas)
 Augie Doggie and Doggie Daddy (Casper's First Christmas)
 Kat Harvey (Casper and The Spooktacular New Adventures of Casper)
 Dr. James Harvey (Casper and The Spooktacular New Adventures of Casper)
 Amelia Harvey (Casper)
 Chris Carson (Casper: A Spirited Beginning)
 Tim Carson (Casper: A Spirited Beginning)
 Sheila Fistergraff (Casper: A Spirited Beginning)
 Jennifer (Casper: A Spirited Beginning)
 The Oracle in the Mirror (Casper Meets Wendy)
 Holly Jollimore (Casper's Haunted Christmas)
 Jimmy Bradley (Casper's Scare School (film) and Casper's Scare School (TV series))
 Ra (Casper's Scare School (film), Casper's Scare School (video game), Casper's Scare School (TV series) and Casper's Scare School (comics))
 Mantha the Zombie (Casper's Scare School (film), Casper's Scare School (video game), Casper's Scare School (TV series) and Casper's Scare School (comics))
 Professor Phinieas Field (Casper and the Spectrals)
 Eloise "Ellie" Essex (Casper and the Spectrals)
 Hot Stuff's family (nameless parents and brother, Casper and the Spectrals)

Enemies 

 Unnamed Greedy Landlord (The Friendly Ghost)
 An unnamed fox and duck hunter and his two hunting dogs (There's Good Boo's Tonight and A Haunting We Will Go.)
 Winifred The Witch (Casper's Halloween Special)
 Screech The Ghost (Casper's Halloween Special)
 Kibosh The Ghost (arch-enemy, Casper: A Spirited Beginning, Casper: Activity Center, Casper's Haunted Christmas, Casper: Friends Around the World, Casper: Spirit Dimensions, Casper's Scare School (film), Casper's Scare School (TV series) and Casper's Scare School: Classroom Capers)
 Snivel The Ghost (Casper: A Spirited Beginning, Casper: Activity Center and Casper's Haunted Christmas)
 The Wizard (Casper: Spirit Dimensions)
 Four Dragons (Casper: Spirit Dimensions)
 Krank (Casper: Spirit Dimensions)
 Doctor Deranged (Casper: Spirit Dimensions)
 Captain Pegleg Potbelly (Casper: Spirit Dimensions)
 Ghostly Trio (Casper's uncles): Stretch, Fatso and Stinkie (sometimes)
 The Witch Sisters (Wendy's aunties): Thelma, Velma and Zelma (sometimes)
 Catherine "Carrigan" Crittenden (Casper)
 Paul "Dibs" Plutzker (Casper)
 Bill Case (Casper: A Spirited Beginning)
 Brock Lee (Casper: A Spirited Beginning)
 Danny (Casper: A Spirited Beginning)
 Leon (Casper: A Spirited Beginning)
 Jennifer (Casper: A Spirited Beginning) (sometimes)
 Desmond Spellman (Casper Meets Wendy)
 Vincent and Jules (Casper Meets Wendy)
 Josh Jackman and his unnamed friend (Casper Meets Wendy)
 Alder and Dash (Casper's Scare School (film) and Casper's Scare School (TV series))
 Thatch (Casper's Scare School (film), Casper's Scare School (video game), Casper's Scare School (TV series) and Casper's Scare School (comics))
 Volbragg (Casper and the Spectrals)

Home media 
In 2011, Shout! Factory released a DVD set titled Casper The Friendly Ghost: The Complete Collection 1945-1963 which contains The Friendly Ghost, There's Good Boos To-Night, A Haunting We Will Go, 55 theatrical cartoons, and all 26 episodes of The New Casper Cartoon Show.

PC and video games

Casper 

Several video games were based on the 1995 film for PC, Super Nintendo Entertainment System, Game Boy, Sega Saturn, 3DO, PlayStation, and Game Boy Color. In subsequent years Windows 95 and Game Boy Advance games were released serving as sequels to the film.

Casper: A Spirited Beginning Activity Center 
Developed by Sound Source Interactive, published by WayForward Technologies and released in 1998 for PC, it is based on the film of the same name and is similar in format to Disney's Activity Center. Set at Ghost Central Station, the player earns Casper coins by completing Casper's Spinning Squares, Stretch's Memory Game, Fatso's Kitchen, Stinkie's Goo Toss and Snivel's Mix & Match. The player must collect at least 15 Casper coins from these five games to unlock Kibosh's Magic Puzzle.

Casper: Friends Around the World 

Developed by Realtime Associates, published by TDK Mediactive and released in 2000 on PlayStation. It is a mostly 2D side-scrolling platform game with occasional forward and backward movements. The evil Kibosh has invented a device to send Casper's human friends to a place where they "would not have a ghost of a chance of being found" and has hypnotized the Ghostly Trio into doing his bidding. However Casper finds a page from a map of Hollywood giving him a clue on where to start his quest to find his friends and the three missing pieces for Kibosh's imprisoning device to get them back home safely. The game is played across ten levels set around the world with 40 friendship crystals on each level to collect in order to advance to the bonus level at the end.

Casper: Spirit Dimensions 

Developed by Lucky Chicken Games and published by TDK Mediactive, it was the first 3D game, to have a movable game camera, based on Casper. It was released in 2001 for PlayStation 2 and in 2002 for Nintendo GameCube. The evil Kibosh has taken over the Spirit World and is intent on also taking over the mortal world. Meanwhile, Wendy the Good Little Witch summons Casper, the only remaining free ghost, and opens the portals to the Spirit Dimensions to help in their only chance to defeat Kibosh.

Casper and the Ghostly Trio 
Developed by Data Design Interactive and Published by Blast! Entertainment, it was released in 2007 on PlayStation 2. It is a 3D game in which Casper has legs and is affected by gravity though he can glide, unlike his flying ability in Spirit Dimensions. The Ghostly Trio have kidnapped Wendy the Good Little Witch in an attempt to use her magic to create a potion that would give them the power to rule Ghostland. Wendy manages to use her magic to get the message across to Casper who must find his way through six levels to rescue her. At the end of the first five levels is a bonus stage in which Casper must collect as many jewels as he can while avoiding the Trio's lightning which is chasing him.

Casper's Scare School 

A series of three games, for PlayStation 2, Nintendo DS and Wii, based on the computer animated film and TV series of the same name released in 2008 and 2009.

See also 

 Ghost stories
 Homer the Happy Ghost
 Timmy the Timid Ghost
 List of ghosts

References

External links 

 
 Don Markstein's Toonopedia
 Casper's Scare School on iTunes

 
Animated characters
Child characters in animated films
Child characters in animated television series
Child characters in comics
Child characters in film
Child characters in television
Famous Studios series and characters
Literary characters introduced in 1939
Fictional characters who can turn intangible
Fictional ghosts
DreamWorks Classics
Fantasy film characters
Harvey Comics series and characters
Harvey Comics titles
Television series by U.M. & M. TV Corporation
American comics adapted into films
Comics characters in television
Humor comics
Comics adapted into television series
Television series by Universal Television
Ghost characters in video games
Casper characters